High-A (officially Class High-A, formerly known as Class A-Advanced, and sometimes abbreviated "A+" in writing) is the third-highest level of play in Minor League Baseball in the United States and Canada, below Triple-A and Double-A, and above Single-A. There are 30 teams classified at the High-A level, one for each team in Major League Baseball (MLB), organized into three leagues: the Midwest League, Northwest League, and South Atlantic League.

History
Class High-A was established as a classification level within Minor League Baseball in 1990 by subdividing the existing Class A. Class A had been the third-highest level in the minor leagues since 1936 (when it was below Double-A and Class A1) and a hierarchy of Triple-A and Double-A above Class A had been in place since 1946. In 1963, the three classes below Class A (Classes B, C, and D) were abolished, with leagues at those levels moved into Class A. In 1965, Class A was subdivided for the first time, with the establishment of lower-level Class A Short Season leagues.

The 1965 hierarchy was in place for 25 years, until Class A was further subdivided in 1990, with Class A-Advanced becoming the third-highest classification:
 Triple-A
 Double-A
 Class A-Advanced
 Class A ("Full-Season A")
 Class A Short Season ("Short-Season A")
 Rookie league

Three leagues, each previously Class A, received the Class A-Advanced designation: the California League, Carolina League, and Florida State League. This arrangement continued until 2021, when Major League Baseball (MLB) restructured the minor leagues, eliminating Class A Short Season and discontinuing the use of all historical league names within Minor League Baseball. The existing Class A-Advanced leagues were moved to the Class A level and operated under generic names (Low-A West, Low-A East, and Low-A Southeast) during 2021. The Class A-Advanced level was officially renamed as "Class High-A", and also operated three leagues during 2021 with generic names: High-A Central, High-A East, and High-A West. These three High-A leagues had historically been known as the Midwest League, South Atlantic League, and Northwest League—the first two had previously operated at the Class A level, while the latter had previously operated at the Class A Short Season level. Following MLB's acquisition of the rights to the names of the historical minor leagues, MLB announced on March 16, 2022, that the leagues would revert to their prior names, effective with the 2022 season.

In January 2023, it was announced that Veronica Gajownik had been hired to manage the Hillsboro Hops, making her the first woman to manage a High-A team.

Current teams

Midwest League

Northwest League

South Atlantic League

Playoffs

On June 30, 2021, Minor League Baseball announced that the top two teams in each league (based on full-season winning percentage, and regardless of division) would meet in a best-of-five postseason series to determine league champions.

References

External links
 

Minor league baseball
Midwest League
Northwest League
South Atlantic League